Blanche of England, LG (spring 1392 – 22 May 1409), also known as Blanche of Lancaster, was a member of the House of Lancaster, the daughter of King Henry IV of England by his first wife Mary de Bohun.

Family
Born at Peterborough Castle (now in Cambridgeshire), Blanche was the sixth of the seven children born during the marriage of Henry of Lancaster and his wife Mary de Bohun. At the time of her birth, Henry was only Earl of Derby and, thanks to his marriage, Earl of Northampton and Earl of Hereford; as the only surviving son of John of Gaunt and Blanche of Lancaster, he was the heir of the Duchy of Lancaster. Blanche was named after her paternal grandmother.

Blanche's mother died on 4 June 1394 in Peterborough Castle after giving birth to her last child, Philippa. Five years later, on 30 September 1399, Blanche's father deposed his cousin Richard II and usurped the throne. Three years later in 1402, her father was remarried, to Joanna, daughter of King Charles II of Navarre and widow of Duke John V of Brittany. There were no children of this marriage.

Marriage

In January 1401 Henry IV held a tournament at Eltham Palace to honour the visit of Manuel II Palaiologos. The tournament was commemorated in literary form as thirteen letters in old French addressed to Blanche. Each letter, supposedly written by a legendary patron, praises one of the combatants. The letters were probably read aloud during the event.<ref>Sarah Carpenter, 'Chivalric Entertainment at the Court of Henry IV: The Jousting Letters of 1401', Medieval English Theatre, 43 (D. S. Brewer, 2022), pp. 39-107.</ref>

After his accession to the English throne, King Henry IV wanted to make important alliances in order to maintain and legitimise his rule. One needed ally was King Rupert of Germany, who had also ascended following his predecessor's deposition: a marriage between Rupert's eldest surviving son Louis and Henry IV's eldest daughter Blanche was soon arranged.

The marriage contract was signed on 7 March 1401 in London; the bride's dowry was fixed in the amount of 40,000 Nobeln (over 300 kg of gold). The formal marriage between Blanche and Louis took place on 6 July 1402 at Cologne Cathedral, Germany. Blanche's dowry included the oldest surviving royal crown known to have been in England. Despite its political nature, the marriage was said to be happy. Four years later, on 22 June 1406 in Heidelberg, Blanche gave birth to a son, called Rupert after his paternal grandfather.

In 1408 Blanche was made Lady of the Garter. One year later, pregnant with her second child, she died of fever in Haguenau, Alsace and was buried in the Church of St. Mary (today St. Aegidius) in Neustadt in the Palatinate.

Her widower became Elector Palatine as Louis III in 1410 after the death of his father King Rupert and in 1417 married Matilda, daughter of Amadeo, Prince of Achaea, member of the House of Savoy, who bore him six children. Blanche's son Rupert (nicknamed the English) died aged nineteen in 1426, unmarried and without issue.

Ancestry

References

Sources

 Walther Holtzmann: Die englische Heirat Pfalzgraf Ludwigs III., in: Zeitschrift für die Geschichte des Oberrheins'' No 43 (1930), pp. 1–22.
 The English Marriage of Elector Palatine Louis III 
 The Crown of Princess Blanka in the Munich Treasury Residence

1392 births
1409 deaths
14th-century English people
15th-century English people
English princesses
House of Lancaster
14th-century English women
15th-century English women
Daughters of kings
Children of Henry IV of England